Trevor Shane (born April 4, 1976) is an American author of contemporary thriller, suspense, speculative fiction, dystopian, drama and genre fiction. His debut novel Children of Paranoia was published in September 2011 by Dutton Books.  It is the first book in a trilogy set to be published by Dutton Books.

He graduated from Columbia University and Georgetown University Law Center.

References

1976 births
Living people
American fiction writers

Columbia College (New York) alumni
Georgetown University Law Center alumni